This is a list of Austrian European Film Award winners and nominees. This list details the performances of Austrian actors, actresses, and films that have either been submitted or nominated for, or have won, a European Film Award.

Awards and nominations

Nominations – 52
Wins – 15

Special awards

See also
 List of Austrian submissions for the Academy Award for Best International Feature Film

References

External links
 Nominees and winners at the European Film Academy website

Austria
European Film Awards